Mountains on Fire is a 1931 German war film directed by Karl Hartl and Luis Trenker and starring Trenker, Lissy Arna and Luigi Serventi. The film was based on Luis Trenker's novel of the same title, partly based on his own experiences. Separate French and English-language productions were also made.

Synopsis
Shortly before the First World War, an Italian and an Austrian take part in a mountaineering expedition together. Not long afterwards they find themselves fighting on different sides. The plot also features references to the mines on the Italian front.

Cast
 Luis Trenker as Florian Dimai
 Lissy Arna as Pia, his wife
 Luigi Serventi as Arthur Franchini, his friend
 Claus Clausen as Leutnant (lieutenant) Kall
 Erika Dannhoff
 Paul Graetz
 Michael von Newlinsky
 Emmerich Albert as Tyrolean mountain guide
 Luis Gerold as Tyrolean mountain guide
 Hans Jamnig as Tyrolean mountain guide
 Hugo Lehner as Tyrolean mountain guide
 Roland von Rossi as Tyrolean mountain guide

See also
 Doomed Battalion (1932)

References

Bibliography

External links

1931 films
Films of the Weimar Republic
1931 war films
German war films
1930s German-language films
Films directed by Karl Hartl
Films directed by Luis Trenker
Films set in the 1910s
Films set in Austria
Films set in Italy
Films set in the Alps
Films shot in Italy
World War I films set on the Italian Front
Mountaineering films
Films based on Austrian novels
Films based on Italian novels
German black-and-white films
German multilingual films
1931 multilingual films
1930s German films